Abbey Murphy (born April 14, 2002) is an American ice hockey forward, currently playing for the Minnesota Golden Gophers in the NCAA. Along with Kendall Coyne Schofield, she is one of two players in history to have scored in three consecutive IIHF World Women's U18 Championship gold medal games.

Career 
Murphy began playing hockey at the age of seven, being taught how to skate by her neighbor, Tom Pratl, after watching him play the sport in his backyard. She first joined the St. Jude Knights Hockey Club, one of just a handful of girls on the team, before joining the Chicago Mission at the age of 10. With the Mission, she won a state championship at the U16 level.

She began attending the University of Minnesota in 2020, playing for the university's women's ice hockey program.

International career 
Murphy represented the United States at the 2018, 2019, and 2020 IIHF World Women's U18 Championships, scoring a total of 13 points in 15 games and winning gold twice and silver once.

On January 2, 2022, Murphy was named to Team USA's roster to represent the United States at the 2022 Winter Olympics.

Personal life 
Murphy attended secondary school at the Mother McAuley Liberal Arts High School. Murphy has two older brothers, Dominic and Patrick, and her parents are Edward and Lynne.

References

External links
 

2002 births
Living people
American women's ice hockey forwards
Ice hockey players from Illinois
Ice hockey players at the 2022 Winter Olympics
Medalists at the 2022 Winter Olympics
Minnesota Golden Gophers women's ice hockey players
Olympic ice hockey players of the United States
Olympic silver medalists for the United States in ice hockey
People from Evergreen Park, Illinois
21st-century American women